Pickshin was an unincorporated community and coal town in Raleigh County, West Virginia, United States. There are no inhabitants. During the years of 1917–27, it was documented to have mined 785,054 tons of coal.

References

History of West Virginia
Ghost towns in West Virginia
Geography of Raleigh County, West Virginia
Coal towns in West Virginia